Imogen Stuart (née Werner; born 1927) is a German-Irish sculptor. She is one of Ireland's best known sculptors with work in public and private collections throughout Europe and the U.S..

She was awarded the Mary McAuley medal in 2010 by President Mary McAleese, who paid tribute to her "genius", crafting "a canon of work that synthesises our complex past, present images and possible futures...as an intrinsic part of the narrative of modern Irish art, of Ireland."

Life
Born Imogen Werner in Berlin, she is the daughter of the art critic and author . She grew up in wartime Berlin, where she took up drawing and sculpting at a young age, encouraged by her father who played an important role in providing a forum for Bauhaus artists through his cultural magazine , and after the war as Cultural Attache for the Federal Republic of Germany in Washington DC. Imogen knew very little about her Jewish origins until after the war.

In 1945 Stuart began studying under Otto Hitzberger, who taught her modelling, carving, and relief work using different materials. She met her future husband, the Irishman Ian Stuart, grandson of Maud Gonne – who was also studying under Hitzberger – in 1948, and in 1949 the two moved to Ireland. They married in 1951 and took up residence in Laragh Castle near Glendalough.

She was elected Saoi by the Aosdána in 2015.

Works

Stuart works in wood, bronze, stone, steel, clay and terracotta. As the most prolific sculptor for both Roman Catholic and Church of Ireland churches her works are found across the country. Her best-known sculptures include the monumental sculpture of Pope John Paul II in St. Patrick's College, Maynooth and the carved altar in the Honan Chapel in Cork.  Nevertheless, her work extends well beyond the Church, including a commissioned bust of ex-President Mary Robinson which sits in Áras an Uachtaráin (the presidential residence in Dublin), the Flame Of Human Dignity at the Centre Culturel Irelandais, Paris; collections of silver, gold and bronze jewellery, drawings, monumental works in wood, stone, concrete, bronze and other media.

"Within the sharply defined limits of material, subject, space, size and money given, I learned to develop within myself a great freedom of expression. My life is full of gifts or minor miracles. I never intellectualize – the eyes and senses dictate my hands directly. Once the work has been completed a symbolism becomes so obviously and profoundly evident that I have to regard it as supernatural.” – Imogen Stuart (Notes On The Life Of A Sculptor, Milltown Studies 22 (1988) 92–94.

A book on her work and life was published in 2002 (Imogen Stuart, Four Courts Press), with an introduction by Brian Fallon and a personal tribute by Peter Harbison.

Mary Immaculate College 
The Sisters of Mercy commissioned three major pieces from Stuart in 1958.  Since then further pieces have been added to the College collection where 15 pieces of Imogen's artwork are on display.

Awards and Accolades
A professor of sculpture at the Royal Hibernian Academy, Dublin, she is also a member of Aosdána, and has received honorary doctorates from Trinity College Dublin (2002), University College Dublin (2004), NUI Maynooth (2005).

References

External links
 Official website
 Aosdána biographical note
 Imogen Stuart Sculptor, Four Courts Press 2002
 Works by Imogen Stuart at Mary Immaculate College
 Imogen Stuart in the Irish Arts Review
 Imogen Stuart Calendar MIC 2019
 St. Stephen's Church, Killiney, Co. Dublin- Imogen Stuart: Artist in Residence
 Stations of the Cross, Ballintubber Abbey, Co. Mayo
 Work in Carpark, Killiney, Co. Dublin

Irish sculptors
Irish expatriates in Germany
Aosdána members
Artists from Berlin
1927 births
Living people
People associated with University College Cork
Irish women artists
Date of birth missing (living people)
People from Sandycove